David John Rose (1922–1985) was a professor of nuclear engineering at MIT.

Education 

Rose received a B.A.Sc. degree in engineering physics from the University of British Columbia in 1947 and a Ph.D. degree in Physics from MIT in 1950. He joined the faculty of the Department of Nuclear Engineering at MIT when it was formed in 1958.

Work history 

Rose served as captain in the Canadian artillery from 1942-1947. He worked at Bell Laboratories until joining the MIT Nuclear Engineering faculty in 1958. He led the development of the Department’s program in plasmas and controlled fusion, and was on the MIT faculty for the rest of his professional career. From 1969 to 1971, during a two year leave of absence, he worked at Oak Ridge National Laboratory, where he was the first director of their office of Long-range planning.

Rose's career was said to have three phases: scientist and engineer; technology/policy analyst; and "bridge builder" between scientific and theological communities. 

Rose retired in December 1984, and moved to Honolulu, HI.

Publications, testimony and other history 

Rose wrote over 150 articles ranging from high technology to theology. He was author of the widely cited Plasmas and Controlled Fusion, with Melville Clark, which became the standard textbook in the field of fusion energy.

In 1975 Rose taught the MIT Nuclear Engineering Department's first course on sustainable energy.

He testified to Congress in 1977. He was the primary author of Learning about Energy, published posthumously in 1986.

Rose was thesis supervisor for  Richard K. Lester.

Shortly before his death, and days before he was hospitalized, Rose wrote an article opposing Star Wars (SDI) and asking for support for a petition against it.

Rose died on October 24, 1985.

Honors, Awards and recognitions 

 Fellow of the American Academy of Arts and Sciences
 Fellow of the American Physical Society
 Fellow of the American Academy for the Advancement of Science. 
 1975 Arthur Holly Compton Award of the American Nuclear Society for excellence in teaching
 James R Killian Jr Faculty Achievement Award and lecturer in 1979-80
 1984 David J. Rose Lecture was established in his honor, to recognize his work in fusion technology, energy and environment impact, nuclear waste management, and ethical issues of science and technology.
 1986 Fusion Power Associates established an annual prize for excellence in fusion engineering in Rose's honor.

References

External links 

MIT Department of Physics alumni
1922 births
1985 deaths
20th-century American physicists
MIT School of Engineering faculty
American nuclear engineers
Fellows of the American Association for the Advancement of Science
20th-century American engineers
Fellows of the American Physical Society
Canadian military personnel of World War II
Canadian emigrants to the United States